Triphenylphosphine phenylimide is the organophosphorus compound with the formula Ph3P=NPh (Ph = C6H5).  It is a white solid that is soluble in organic solvents.  The compound is a prototype of a large class of Staudinger reagents, resulting from the Staudinger reaction.

The phosphine imides were first prepared in the laboratory of Nobelist Hermann Staudinger. His synthesis involved the direct reaction of triphenylphosphine with phenylazide. 
Ph3P  +  N3Ph   →    Ph3P=NPh  +  N2
X-ray crystallography establishes that the P-N-C angle is bent (130.4°) and the P-N distance is 160 pm.

References

Organophosphorus compounds
Phenyl compounds